Salem University, Lokoja is a privately owned university located in Lokoja, Kogi State, Nigeria. The institution was founded by Archbishop Sam Amaga, the president of Salem International Christian Center.

Governance 

The university is governed by the board of trustees, the governing council and the university management staff.

Other officers 
 Deans of Colleges
 Director of Works
 Director of Academic Planning Unit
 Director of Quality Assurance and Academic Standard
 Director Centre for Entrepreneurial Studies 
 Deputy Registrar
 Head of Departments

Academic programmes

Salem University offers Bachelor's degrees in three colleges offering degrees in computer science, information technology, natural and applied sciences, management, and social sciences. It does not offer post-graduate degrees.

Campus 

The University is situated on its only campus in Jimgbe, Lokoja, where all its academic activities take place. All undergraduate students also reside here.

References

External links

http://webometrics.info/en/Africa
http://campusportal.com.ng/cu/

Educational institutions established in 2008
Universities and colleges in Nigeria
Kogi State
2008 establishments in Nigeria
Private universities and colleges in Nigeria